Eric Henry Knell (1 April 1903 – January 1987) was the Bishop of Reading from 1954 until 1972.

Knell was educated at Trinity College, Oxford and ordained in 1929. Beginning his ministry with a curacy at St Barnabas, Southfields he was successively: Domestic Chaplain to the Bishop of Lincoln; Priest in charge of  the  Trinity College, Oxford, Mission in Stratford; Vicar of Emmanuel, Forest Gate, then  Christ Church, Reading; and finally, before his appointment to the episcopate, Archdeacon of Berkshire. In 1972 he retired to Lingfield, Surrey and continued to serve the Church as an Assistant Bishop within the Diocese of Oxford.

References

1903 births
1987 deaths
Alumni of Trinity College, Oxford
Archdeacons of Berkshire
Bishops of Reading
20th-century Church of England bishops